Ričardas Zdančius (born 17 January 1967 in Gargždai) is a former Lithuanian professional footballer, member of the Lithuania national team. He won a total of 24 international caps, scoring 4 goals for the Lithuania national football team.

Honours
 Baltic Cup
 1996

External links
 Short biography 

1967 births
Living people
Lithuanian footballers
Lithuania international footballers
Lithuanian expatriate footballers
FC Flora players
Expatriate footballers in Estonia
Lithuanian expatriate sportspeople in Estonia
FC Zugdidi players
People from Gargždai
Association football defenders
Meistriliiga players